The Seibu SPI System is Seibu Kaihatsu's custom arcade system board. The Seibu SPI system board uses interchangeable game cartridges, however, each cartridge is region specific, and must be paired with a board of the same region. Seibu SPI boards "update" when a game cartridge is changed. This process takes about 10 minutes to complete, and only has to be performed once after a cart change.

There is also a single-board version of the SPI hardware.

Technical specifications
CPU: Intel 80386-DX 32-bit CISC CPU 25 MHz
 AMD AM386-DX/DXL 25 MHz CPU used on some models
Graphics processor: Custom Seibu graphics hardware
 240 x 320 pixels
 6144 colors max
Sound processor: Yamaha YMF271-F (OPX), Zilog Z80 CPU 8 MHz
Storage media: ROM, EPROM

List of Seibu SPI games

Senkyu (Battle Balls)
E-Jan High School
E-Jan Sakurasou
Raiden Fighters
Raiden Fighters 2
Raiden Fighters Jet 
Viper Phase 1

Arcade system boards
x86-based computers